Alexander Anatolyevich Yegorov (born August 30, 1972, Saransk, USSR) is a Russian football referee in the Russian Premier League.

Career 
Yegorov has been working as a referee in official Russian Football Union tournaments since 2000. He began refereeing matches as a head referee for the second-division Russian football league in 2001, and has worked as a head referee for the first-division Russian football league since 2007.

Yegorov's debut as a head referee in a Premier League match was in the 3rd round of the season 2011/2012 between FC Volga Nizhny Novgorod and FC Dynamo Moscow.

References

External links
  
 
 

1972 births
People from Saransk
Living people
Russian football referees